Zend is a Zoroastrian technical term for exegetical glosses, paraphrases, commentaries and translations of the Avesta's texts.

Zend may also refer to:

Computing
 Zend, a computer software company
 Zend Engine, an open-source scripting engine for the PHP programming language
 Laminas, a PHP-based web development framework formerly known as Zend Framework
 Zend Studio, an integrated development environment for PHP
 Zend Server, a web application server for running PHP applications

Other uses
 Zend language, historical name for the Avestan language
 Salla Zend, a fictional character in Star Wars